Joško Kreković (born 17 April 1969) is a Croatian former water polo player and current coach, who was a member of the Croatia national team that won the silver medal at the 1996 Summer Olympics in Atlanta. He currently serves as a head coach of the junior Croatia national team.

His son Karlo Kreković is also a professional water polo player.

See also
 List of Olympic medalists in water polo (men)

References

External links
 

1969 births
Living people
Croatian male water polo players
Croatian water polo coaches
Olympic silver medalists for Croatia in water polo
Water polo players at the 1996 Summer Olympics
Medalists at the 1996 Summer Olympics
Water polo players from Split, Croatia
Expatriate water polo players
Croatian expatriate sportspeople in Italy